West Bathurst is a suburb of Bathurst in the Bathurst Region, New South Wales, Australia.

Heritage listings
West Bathurst has a number of heritage-listed sites, including:
 56 Suttor Street: Number 470 Fire Bell

References 
West Bathurst, New South Wales

Bathurst Region